P106 may refer to:
 , a patrol boat of the Mexican Navy
 Papyrus 106, a biblical manuscript
 P106, a state regional road in Latvia